Alexander Nikolayevich Serov (born 24 March 1954 in Kovalivka, Mykolaiv Oblast, Ukraine 

He is born in Ukraine. he is a Russian popular singer who is best known for early success in the Russian language with the songs of Igor Krutoy. He is no known relation to Alexander Nikolayevich Serov the 19th Century classical composer.
He achieved success based in Moscow, and is a People's Artist of Russia (2004).

Popular songs
 "Ya lublu tebya do slez"
 "Madonna" ("Мадонна")
 "Ti menya lubish" ("Ты меня любишь")
 "Kak Mne Byt" (Как мне быть)
 "Vorovannaya noch" (Ворованная ночь)
 "Zvezdopad" ("Звездопад")
 "Proklyataya" ("Проклятая")
 "Osennyaya rosa" ("Осення роса")
 "Muzika venchalnya" ("Музыка Венчальная")
 "Susanna" ("Сюзанна")
 "Ya v tebya davno vluyblen" ("Я в тебя давно влюблён")
 "Beskonechnaya Lyubov" ("Бесконечная любовь")
 "Svechi" ("Свечи")
 "Moya Boginya" ("Моя Богиня")
 "Prosti Menya" ("Прости меня")
 "Davai drug druga ukradiom" ("Давай друг друга украдём")
 "Ya Ne Veryu" ("Я не верю")

References

External links 
 Official website (Russian)
 
 Aleksander Serov at MTV
 

1954 births
Living people
People from Mykolaiv Oblast
Soviet male singers
People's Artists of Russia
Honored Artists of the RSFSR
Recipients of the title of People's Artists of Ukraine
Recipients of the Lenin Komsomol Prize
Soviet pianists
Russian pianists
Male pianists
21st-century pianists
20th-century Russian male singers
20th-century pianists
20th-century Russian singers
21st-century Russian singers
21st-century Russian male singers
Winners of the Golden Gramophone Award
Russian people of Ukrainian descent